Chakdaha Assembly constituency is an assembly constituency in Nadia district in the Indian state of West Bengal.

Overview
As per orders of the Delimitation Commission, No. 91 Chakdaha Assembly constituency is composed of the following: Chakdaha municipality, and Chanduria I, Dubra, Ghetugachhi, Rautari, Silinda I, Silinda II, Tatla Iand Tatla II gram panchayats of Chakdaha community development block.

Chakdaha Assembly constituency is part of No. 13 Ranaghat (Lok Sabha constituency) (SC). It was earlier part of Nabadwip (Lok Sabha constituency).

Members of Legislative Assembly

Election Results

2021

2016
In the 2016 election,  Ratna Kar Ghosh of the All India Trinamool Congress defeated his nearest rival Biswanath Gupta of CPI(M).

2011
In the 2011 election,  Naresh Chandra Chaki of Trinamool Congress defeated his nearest rival Biswanath Gupta of CPI(M).

1977-2006
In the 2006 state assembly elections Malay Kumar Samanta  of CPI (M) won the Chakdaha assembly seat defeating his nearest rival Naresh Chandra Chaki of Trinamool Congress. Contests in most years were multi cornered but only winners and runners are being mentioned. In 2001, 1996 and 1991, Satyasadhan Chakraborty of CPI (M) defeated his nearest rivals Gouri Sankar Dutta, Sukumar Sarkar and Sukumar Roy (all of Congress) in the respective years. In 1987 and 1982, Subhas Basu of CPI (M) defeated Sanatanu Bhowmick and Narendra Nath Sarkar (both of Congress) in the respective years. In 1977, Binoy Kumar Biswas, Independent, defeated Saradindu Biswas of Congress.

1957-1972
Hari Das Mitra of Congress won in 1972. Subhash Chandra Basu of CPI(M) won in 1971. Subal Chandra Mandal of Bangla Congress won in 1969. H.Mitra of Bangla Congress won in 1967. Santi Das of Congress won in 1962. Suresh Chandra Banerjee of PSP won in 1957. The Chakdaha seat was not there in 1951.

References

Assembly constituencies of West Bengal
Politics of Nadia district